Diamondback (Rachel Leighton) is a fictional character appearing in American comic books published by Marvel Comics. Originally depicted as a supervillain who was part of the Serpent Society, she was first introduced in Captain America #310 (Oct. 1985) and became a series regular for years afterwards.

Rachel Leighton made her debut as part of the Serpent Society and soon came into conflict with Captain America as the group carried out an assassination. Later on Leighton started to develop feelings for Captain America, drawing her away from the Society to the side of the good guys. After Captain America helped foil a takeover by Viper, the two began to date. Because of her involvement with a super hero the Serpent Society voted to execute her, but her life was spared by her friends within the Serpent Society. Leighton, along with Black Mamba and Asp, formed BAD Girls, Inc. a trio of adventurers who would on occasion aid Captain America. During the "Civil War" storyline BAD Girls, Inc. sided with Captain America's Anti-Registration group. She later became an agent of S.H.I.E.L.D., before briefly returning to her criminal roots as part of Serpent Solutions.

Publication history

Rachel Leighton first appeared in Captain America #310 (Oct. 1985), and was created by Mark Gruenwald and Paul Neary.

Fictional character biography
Rachel Leighton was born in Austin, Texas. She was once a part-time sales clerk at a boutique, but later became a mercenary. In Captain America #319, she reveals to Captain America that she has a brother and that when she was younger was introduced by him to the super-criminal known as the Trapster. In exchange for weaponry that the Trapster provides her with, Leighton suggests that in return she prostitutes herself to the criminal. One of the members of the original Serpent Society, Diamondback was a seductively sly woman with expertise in hand-to-hand combat, being trained by Anaconda at Taskmaster's academy. Her gimmick was that she threw acid-laced or poison-tipped diamonds at her enemies. After her first confrontation with Captain America while on assignment to find MODOK, she was instantly smitten. Diamondback was assigned to take Captain America into custody from the Porcupine, but was reluctant to attack, concentrating her efforts on Porcupine instead. She later attempted to form a partnership with Captain America to locate the Scourge of the Underworld.

Viper staged a coup of the Serpent Society, causing several of her underlings to infiltrate as new members and setting Viper up to take over by force. Diamondback and their current leader Sidewinder escaped, recruiting Captain America's allies to rescue the Serpents who were still loyal to Sidewinder. After a fierce battle, in which Viper was defeated, Sidewinder abandoned the Serpent Society. Diamondback stayed on for a while under the new leader, Cobra.

Rachel was later revealed to have resigned from the Serpent Society, and somehow temporarily switched bodies with the X-Man Dazzler. This led, in part, to a confrontation between the Serpent Society and the X-Men. Diamondback later alerted Captain America to the Bloodstone Hunt. She aided Captain America in combat with Batroc, Machete, Zaran, and Baron Helmut Zemo. She also encountered Crossbones for the first time. Diamondback later accompanied Captain America to the Red Skull's Skullhouse.

Diamondback and Captain America eventually went on their first date, aided by Rachel's friends in the Serpent Society, Asp, Black Mamba, and Anaconda. She then battled the Black Widow, and acquired a new costume. Diamondback was eventually put on trial by the Serpent Society for her consorting with the enemy (most of the Society assuming, incorrectly, that Diamondback had betrayed their secrets to Captain America) and found guilty for her actions, and almost executed. She escaped with Captain America and Paladin's help, and later hired Paladin to help get revenge on the Serpent Society. Along with her best friends Black Mamba and Asp, she formed "BAD Girls, Inc."  After a failed kidnapping attempt from Anaconda, Diamondback was taken aboard Superia's ship, and joined her Femizons under duress. While aboard Superia's ship, she was attacked by the Femizon Snapdragon, of whom Diamondback developed a phobia. After being rescued and then being used as a test subject by the Red Skull to see if the blood packets that Crossbones brought was really Captain America's blood, the super-soldier serum enhanced Diamondback tracked down and confronted Snapdragon, who died in the fight.

Later, there was a glitch discovered in the super-soldier serum that Cap was suffering from and Diamondback went to Superia in hopes for a cure. Using her as a test subject, there was a 50/50 chance that the cure would either work or kill Diamondback. As an added stipulation, if the test was successful, Diamondback had to serve Superia as the second Snapdragon. The experiment was a success, but she later got out of this deal when Superia was killed.

BAD Girls disbanded after that. Some time later, Diamondback was infected with "mind-control nanoprobes" by Baron Zemo. Diamondback suffered extensive neurological damage from the experience, and spent an extended period of time recovering in S.H.I.E.L.D. care.

BAD Girls, Inc. reappeared in Cable & Deadpool, with the original lineup intact.

Rachel's brother Danny is also known as Cutthroat. It was Danny and another of her brothers, Ricky, who originally fell in with a gang led by a man known as "Bing." Yearning to be included, she approached Bing alone. Upon claiming she would do anything to join the gang, Rachel was beaten and possibly raped by Bing, who years later became Crossbones, kidnapped her, starved her and abused her until she agreed, with ulterior motive, to steal packages of Captain America's blood from Avengers Mansion. Bing/Crossbones murdered Danny/Cutthroat, who was attempting to replace him as aid to the Red Skull, and also killed Rachel's third brother, Willy, when, despite being crippled in the military, he sought revenge by rifle for the brutality inflicted on his sister soon after she was originally mistreated.

Diamondback later turned up along with Asp and Black Mamba during the "Civil War" as a member of the Secret Avengers. She took part in the final battle of the "war", but did not accept the offer of amnesty that came with Captain America's surrender. Later Diamondback and the other BAD Girls were captured by the Mighty Avengers in a New York City street mall.

Diamondback appears in Camp Hammond, as an official recruit for the Initiative, along with Ant-Man, Crusader, Melee, Geldoff, Dragon Lord, Geiger, and Red Nine. All of them were defeated by K.I.A., a rogue clone of Michael Van Patrick. She later joined other members of the Inititative in battling the Skrulls in New York during the Secret Invasion storyline.

When Norman Osborn assumes control of the Initiative during the "Dark Reign" storyline, Diamondback agrees to work for him. Diamondback is revealed as a member of the Initiative's new team for the state of Delaware, the Women Warriors. After the Constrictor saves her life from a crashing plane, the two begin a sexual relationship. However, Constrictor discovers that she is secretly working for Gauntlet's "Avengers Resistance". Constrictor decides not to say anything but worries about what would happen if she were found out. Both Diamondback and Constrictor are part of the invasion of Asgard. Diamondback tries to contact the Resistance but cannot get through. She debates whether or not to help Thor when Osborn and several others gang up on him. When Maria Hill comes to Thor's defense by firing a rocket launcher at Osborn's men, Diamondback adds to the explosion by dropping some explosive diamonds. Constrictor saves her and the two argue about her reckless behavior. They witness Sentry killing Ares and Diamondback sees Steve Rogers entering the battlefield. As the Avengers begin to turn the tide in the battle, Diamondback tries to get Steve Rogers's attention and make sure he knows she and Constrictor are on his side. Constrictor misinterprets her actions and think she's abandoning him. She turns to find him but at the same time Sentry attacks Asgard's foundations on Osborn's orders. As Rachel and Constrictor reach out to each other, Asgard falls to the ground. Rachel is dug out by Steve Rogers. Constrictor sees this and thinking Rachel does not love him, flees the scene with Taskmaster. After Osborn's defeat, Rachel attends a party at Avengers Tower where Rogers asks her to coordinate the remaining Fifty State teams. She tells him she will consider it.

Later, Rachel is shown working as an agent of S.H.I.E.L.D. and sporting a new costume.

As part of the 2015-2017 All-New, All-Different Marvel branding, Captain America learns of Viper's plans with the Serpent Society, who are now operating under the new name of Serpent Solutions. He visits the retired mercenary Diamondback for information on the group. Their meeting is interrupted by Cottonmouth, Black Racer, and Copperhead. During the ensuing battle, Black Racer stabs Diamondback in the stomach. After Captain America defeats the three villains, he rushed to Diamondback's aid. Diamondback immediately betrays Captain America, revealing herself to be a member of the Serpent Society once again, and Captain America is taken prisoner and brought to the Serpent Society's lair. This leads to a confrontation between the Society and Captain America, Joaquin Torres, Misty Knight, and Demolition Man, during which Diamondback turns against Viper and helps the heroes defeat the Society.

Diamondback is next seen working with her close friends Domino and Outlaw as mercenaries.

Related Diamondbacks

Debbie Bertrand
A third Diamondback appeared in the "Secret War" storyline. This Diamondback was Deborah "Debbie" Bertrand. Debbie attended the University of North Carolina on an athletics scholarship, becoming an All-American Olympic athlete and gymnast. For undisclosed reasons, apparently quitting this career to try her hand as a mercenary, she purchased equipment from the Tinkerer, which he had designed for Diamondback (Rachel Leighton). Perhaps hoping to use Leighton's reputation to boost her own fledgling career, Bertrand adopted the same code name, despite Leighton still being active in that identity. Nick Fury thought to himself that when Rachel found out, she would "kick the impostor's butt". Bertrand teamed with Scorcher to attack Daredevil in his apartment. They didn't count on Spider-Man being there and had to retreat. She took part in the battle at Mount Sinai Hospital and was apprehended after the heroes won the day.

Rachel Leighton LMD
A fourth Diamondback, apparently the real Rachel Leighton, resurfaced as a S.H.I.E.L.D. operative, trying to rekindle her romance with Captain America, while in fact she was working undercover for the Red Skull. Truly loving Steve Rogers, but still willing to follow the plot, she was confronted and killed by the Red Skull himself, only to "resurrect" herself with a biomechanical form able to take over pieces of technology, like the empowering armor worn by the Nazi villain. Nick Fury then explained that the "new" Rachel was an advanced Life Model Decoy, in fact so advanced as to believe itself to be human, and kept her in storage while working at a way to restore her proper programming. Before "she" could be restored, the Iron Maniac wiped out all her memories, and reshaped her body in a new neurokinetical armor for himself.

Hobgoblin's Diamondback
While regaining his franchises, Roderick Kingsley sold one of Diamondback's old costumes to an unnamed criminal in order to become his version of Diamondback.

Powers and abilities
Rachel Leighton is an athletic woman with no superhuman powers. She has skill in gymnastics, and at pitching small ballistic objects with great accuracy, and at piloting small aircraft. She also has knowledge of general street-fighting techniques, and some jujitsu. Leighton wears a costume of synthetic stretch fabric backed by Kevlar weave, with two biceps-belts and two thigh-belts for carrying throwing diamonds, concealed pockets in the boot tops, boot-heels, glove tops, and brassiere for other throwing diamonds, and throwing diamond earrings. Her personal weaponry consists of throwing diamonds, which are actually  hollow zirconium octahedrons (though not made of diamond, they are shaped like diamonds) containing various substances; spent uranium, plastic explosives, nitric acid, tear gas, smoke, curare-derived narcotics, etc. Her equipment was originally designed and manufactured by the Trapster, but her later design and manufacture was by the Tinkerer.

Reception

Accolades 

 In 2020, Scary Mommy included Rachel Leighton in their "195+ Marvel Female Characters Are Truly Heroic" list.
 In 2022, Screen Rant included Rachel Leighton in their "10 Best Anti-Heroes Not Yet In The MCU" list.

Other versions
The Ultimate Marvel version of Rachael Leighton appears as a teenage street punk by the name of Diamondback. She is a member of the Serpent Skulls gang and an enemy of Spider-Man and the All-New Ultimates.

In other media

Television
 Diamondback appears in Marvel Disk Wars: The Avengers, voiced by Naomi Shindō and by Rachel Robinson in the English dub. This version is the partner of Rosetta Riley and a member of the Serpent Society.
 Diamondback appears in the Marvel Future Avengers episode "Mission Black Market Auction", voiced by Naomi Shindō in Japanese and Courtenay Taylor in English. This version is a member of B.A.D. Girls, Inc. She is hired alongside Asp and Black Mamba to guard a cruise ship where an illegal auction for a powerful weapon was to take place. However, they are defeated by Wasp, Black Widow, and Charade.

Video games
 Diamondback appears as a boss in Marvel: Ultimate Alliance 2, voiced by Jameela McMillan.
 Diamondback appears as a playable character in Lego Marvel's Avengers.

References

External links
 Diamondback at Marvel.com
 

Characters created by Mark Gruenwald
Characters created by Paul Neary
Comics characters introduced in 1985
Fictional blade and dart throwers
Fictional characters from Texas
Fictional mercenaries in comics
Marvel Comics female superheroes
Marvel Comics female supervillains
Marvel Comics martial artists
Marvel Comics television characters